The president of India is the head of state of India. This is a list of things named after presidents of India.

Rajendra Prasad
 Localities

 Rajendra Nagar, Delhi
 Rajendra Nagar, Indore
 Rajendra Nagar railway station
 Rajendra Nagar, Lucknow
 Rajendra Nagar, Patna
 Rajendra Nagar Terminal railway station
 Rajendranagar mandal
 Rajendra Place
 Rajendra Place metro station

 Stadiums

 Dr. Rajendra Prasad Stadium
 Rajendra Stadium

 Educational institutions

 Dr. Rajendra Prasad Central Agriculture University
 Dr. Rajendra Prasad Government Medical College
 Rajendra College, Chapra
 Rajendra Institute of Medical Sciences
 Rajendra Memorial Research Institute of Medical Sciences

 Others

 Rajendra Setu
 Rajendra Smriti Sangrahalaya

Sarvepalli Radhakrishnan
 Educational institutions

 Dr. Radhakrishnan Government Medical College
 Dr. Sarvepalli Radhakrishnan Government Arts College
 Dr. Sarvepalli Radhakrishnan Rajasthan Ayurved University
 Sarvepalli Radhakrishnan University

Zakir Husain
 Educational institutions

 Zakir Husain Delhi College

V. V. Giri
 Educational institutions

 V. V. Giri National Labour Institute

Fakhruddin Ali Ahmed
 Educational institutions

 Fakhruddin Ali Ahmed Medical College and Hospital

Neelam Sanjiva Reddy
 Stadiums

 Neelam Sanjiva Reddy Stadium

Zail Singh
 Educational institutions

 Giani Zail Singh Campus College of Engineering and Technology

K. R. Narayanan
 Educational institutions

 K. R. Narayanan National Institute of Visual Science and Arts

A. P. J. Abdul Kalam

Pratibha Patil
 Others

 Pratibha Mahila Sahakari Bank

See also
 List of things named after prime ministers of India
 List of things named after prime ministers of the United Kingdom
 List of things named after Saudi kings
 List of things named after Mahatma Gandhi
 List of things named after B. R. Ambedkar
 List of eponymous roads in Delhi
 List of eponymous roads in Mumbai

References

India